Dixon Hill may refer to:
Dixon Hill (Star Trek), a metafictional detective in Star Trek
Dixon Hill, a settlement on San Salvador Island, the Bahamas
Dixon Hill, a neighborhood of Mount Washington, Baltimore